Gerrard Street may refer to:

Gerrard Street, London in London, United Kingdom
Gerrard Street (Toronto) in Toronto, Canada